Andrey Golovko (born 1980) is a Kazakhstani cross-country skier. He competed at the Winter Olympics in 2002 in Salt Lake City, and in Turin in 2006, placing 29th in the 30 km and 29th in the 50 km.

References

1980 births
Living people
Cross-country skiers at the 2002 Winter Olympics
Cross-country skiers at the 2006 Winter Olympics
Kazakhstani male cross-country skiers
Olympic cross-country skiers of Kazakhstan
Asian Games medalists in cross-country skiing
Cross-country skiers at the 2003 Asian Winter Games
Cross-country skiers at the 2007 Asian Winter Games
Medalists at the 2003 Asian Winter Games
Medalists at the 2007 Asian Winter Games
Asian Games gold medalists for Kazakhstan
Asian Games silver medalists for Kazakhstan
Asian Games bronze medalists for Kazakhstan
20th-century Kazakhstani people
21st-century Kazakhstani people